Musica Poetica may refer to:
Musica poetica, theory of music in 16th–17th Century Germany, developing "figures" by analogy with rhetoric
Musica poetica, music theory book by Joachim Burmeister
Musica poetica, music theory book by Johann Andreas Herbst
Musica Poetica, Orff Schulwerk compositions by Carl Orff and Gunild Keetman